Attongtonganebwokwbwokw (also known as Yattokoton or Yattokoton-To; Marshallese:) is an island of the Marshall Islands.

See also
Mili Atoll

References

Mili Atoll
Islands of the Marshall Islands